Kostas Sykaras (born May 30, 1984 in Marousi, Greece) is an alpine skier from Greece. He will compete for Greece at the 2014 Winter Olympics in three alpine skiing events.

References 

1984 births
Living people
Greek male alpine skiers
Alpine skiers at the 2014 Winter Olympics
Olympic alpine skiers of Greece
Sportspeople from Athens